"Life After You" is a song by American rock band Daughtry, released as the second single from their second album, Leave This Town (2009). Chris Daughtry wrote the song with Nickelback vocalist Chad Kroeger and producer Joey Moi. Two versions of the original version exist: an album version and a music video version with the crowd cheering at the end. "Life After You" received positive reviews from music critics and was a success in most of the charts. It was also featured as the soundtrack of the 2013 animated film Alpha and Omega 2: A Howl-iday Adventure.

Background
Chad Kroeger offered "Life After You" to Chris Daughtry while he was still on tour with Bon Jovi. Daughtry was not sure if the song suited the band, but a year later, unable to get the song out of his head, he wrote the bridge for the song.  It was included in his album Leave This Town and was released as the second single from the album.

Promotion
The band performed the song live at the American Music Awards on November 22, 2009. The song was also performed by the band at halftime during the Oakland Raiders vs. Dallas Cowboys Thanksgiving football game. It is included on the soundtrack of Alpha and Omega 2: A Howl-iday Adventure.

Chart performance
"Life After You" debuted at number 66 on the Billboard Hot 100 the chart week of December 19, 2009, and moved up to number 36. It reached number five on Adult Pop Songs (formerly known as the Adult Top 40), making it the band's seventh consecutive top-10 hit there. It spent a total of 62 weeks at number one on the Rock Digital Songs chart, making it the longest song at number one, beating their own record of 23 weeks set with "It's Not Over". The single had sold 890,000 digital downloads as of January 2011. It also ranked number 96 in the 2010 year-end chart. On the Billboard Hot 100, Daughtry obtained their seventh top-40 single with this song.

On the issue dated February 27, 2010, "Life After You" became the group's seventh top-40 hit on the Canadian Hot 100, peaking at number 39, later rising to 34.

Music video
Daughtry released the music video for "Life After You" on October 15, 2009.

Summary
The video begins with Chris in a hotel room trying to call his wife who does not pick up. He then leaves the hotel and gets on a bus and soon winds up in a bar. He then gets up and goes into the back to a warehouse where the rest of the band is waiting for him and they start performing. He then sees his wife and he celebrates with the other members. He is then seen talking with her on the phone and after he hangs up, he and the band go onto the stage where the audience is waiting. His wife's face is never shown.

Track listing
 "Life After You" – 3:26
 "Life After You" (acoustic) – 3:32

Charts

Weekly charts

Year-end charts

References

2009 singles
2009 songs
Daughtry (band) songs
RCA Records singles
Rock ballads
Song recordings produced by Howard Benson
Songs written by Brett James
Songs written by Chad Kroeger
Songs written by Chris Daughtry
Songs written by Joey Moi